Hampala lopezi is a species of ray-finned fish in the family Cyprinidae.
It is found only in the Philippines.

References

Cyprininae
Freshwater fish of the Philippines
Fish described in 1924
Taxonomy articles created by Polbot